The Rough Guide to the Music of North Africa is a world music compilation album originally released in 1997. Part of the World Music Network Rough Guides series, the album contains five Algerian tracks, five Egyptian, two Sudanese, and two Moroccan, focusing mainly on modern music but including some traditional works. The compilation was produced by Phil Stanton, co-founder of the World Music Network.

Adam Greenberg of AllMusic gave the album four stars, calling it a "rather comprehensive" overview of the region's genres and a "worthwhile listen." Michaelangelo Matos, writing for the Chicago Reader, called the album's tracks "effortlessly tuneful", stating "this is what college radio in the Sudan should sound like."

Track listing

References 

1997 compilation albums
World Music Network Rough Guide albums